Bradyaerobic is a term used in biology that describes an animal that has low levels of oxygen consumption.  

By necessity a bradyaerobic animal can engage in short low or high low-level aerobic exercise, followed by brief anaerobically powered bursts of energy.  Bradyaerobes can be sprinters, but not long-distance animals.

References

Thermoregulation